The 1956 U.S. Women's Open was the eleventh U.S. Women's Open, held July 26–29 at Northland Country Club in Duluth, Minnesota. It was the fourth edition conducted by the United States Golf Association (USGA).

Kathy Cornelius won her only major championship in an 18-hole playoff over amateur Barbara McIntire by a score of 75 to 82.

Northland was designed by noted course architect Donald Ross.

Past champions in the field

Final leaderboard
Saturday, July 28, 1956

Source:

Playoff
Sunday, July 29, 1956

Source:

References

External links
USGA final leaderboard
U.S. Women's Open Golf Championship
U.S. Women's Open – past champions – 1956
Northland Country Club

U.S. Women's Open
Golf in Minnesota
Sports competitions in Minnesota
U.S. Women's Open
U.S. Women's Open
U.S. Women's Open
Women's sports in Minnesota